Ngomeni is a settlement in Kenya's Eastern Province. Ngomeni Rock spans an area of about three square kilometers. Catch basins constructed around the edges of Ngomeni Rock retain rainwater that runs off from the Rock's surface, providing water for the neighboring village. Prior to that, women had to walk kilometers to a water source.

References 

Populated places in Eastern Province (Kenya)